Coleophora corticosa is a moth of the family Coleophoridae. It is found in Spain.

References

corticosa
Moths described in 1999
Moths of Europe